Hallie K. Biden (née Olivere) (born July 6, 1973) is an American school counselor, non-profit executive, and member of the Biden family. She worked as a school counselor at the Tatnall School in Wilmington, Delaware and at Archmere Academy in Claymont, Delaware. In 2002, she married Beau Biden, a son of U.S. President Joe Biden and Neilia Hunter Biden. They lived in Wilmington while her husband served as the Attorney General of Delaware. After her husband's death from glioblastoma in 2015, Biden became the chairwoman of the board of directors for the Beau Biden Foundation For the Protection of Children. She received media attention and scrutiny for her romantic relationship with Beau's brother Hunter Biden from 2016 to 2019.

Early life and education 
Biden was born on July 6, 1973, in Greenville, Delaware to Louis Ronald "Ron" Olivere and Joan Berger. Her mother, who was a childhood friend of Joe Biden, owned a drycleaning business. She is of Jewish background. She was educated at the Tatnall School, a private college preparatory school near Wilmington, Delaware.

Career 
Biden worked as an admissions counselor at her alma mater, the Tatnall School, and as a guidance counselor at Archmere Academy. She serves as the Chairwoman of the Board of Directors for the Beau Biden Foundation For the Protection of Children.

Personal life 

In 1998, she began dating her childhood friend Joseph Robinette "Beau" Biden III, who worked as a federal prosecutor in the United States Attorney's Office for the Eastern District of Pennsylvania. The two became engaged during a family Thanksgiving celebration in Nantucket. She married Beau Biden in 2002. They had two children: daughter Natalie Naomi Biden (b. 2004), and son Robert Hunter Biden II (b. 2006). The family lived in Wilmington, Delaware while her husband served as the Attorney General of Delaware.

Her husband died from brain cancer in 2015. Biden maintained a close relationship with other members of the Biden family after her husband's death, encouraging her father-in-law to run in the 2016 presidential election, consulting him before the launch of his 2020 presidential campaign and attending mass with the family at St. Joseph on the Brandywine. In 2016, she began a relationship with her brother-in-law, Hunter Biden, who was in the process of going through a separation from his wife, Kathleen Buhle. She and Hunter Biden moved to Annapolis, Maryland with her children. They ended their relationship in 2019. In March 2019, The Key School filed a lawsuit against Biden, stating that she failed to pay $55,740 in tuition for her two children for the 2018–2019 school year.

In August 2022, a Twitter account impersonating Biden tweeted, "President Trump won that election and my entire family knows it." Her spokesperson stated that the account was run by an imposter and not by Biden.

References 

Living people
1973 births
20th-century American Jews
21st-century American Jews
Hallie
Delaware Democrats
Jewish women
People from Greenville, Delaware
School counselors
Spouses of Delaware politicians